Twelve women's teams competed in basketball at the 2000 Summer Olympics.

Australia 
Sandy Brondello
Michelle Brogan
Carla Boyd
Jo Hill
Kristi Harrower
Shelley Sandie
Annie la Fleur
Trisha Fallon
Lauren Jackson
Rachael Sporn
Michele Timms
Jenny Whittle
Head coach: Tom Maher

Brazil 
Adriana Aparecida dos Santos
Adrianinha
Alessandra Santos de Oliveira
Cíntia Tuiú
Claudinha
Helen Cristina Santos Luz
Zaine
Janeth dos Santos Arcain
Kelly da Silva Santos
Lílian Cristina Lopes Gonçalves
Marta de Souza Sobral
Silvinha

Canada 
Cori-Lyn Blakebrough
Carolin Bouchard 
Kelly Boucher 
Claudia Brassard-Riebesehl 
 Stacey Dales-Schuman
Michelle Hendry 
Nikki Johnson
Karla Karch
Teresa Kleindienst
Joy McNichol
Dianne Norman 
Tammy Sutton-Brown

Cuba 
Liset Castillo
Milayda Enríquez 
Cariola Hechavarría 
Dalia Henry 
Grisel Herrera
María León
Yamilé Martínez 
Yaquelín Plutín
Tania Seino
Yuliseny Soria
Taimara Suero 
Lisdeivis Víctores

France 
Laure Savasta
Sandra Le Drean
Catherine Melain
Edwige Lawson
Yannick Souvré
Audrey Sauret
Nathalie Lesdema
Stéphanie Vivenot
Dominique Tonnerre
Isabelle Fijalkowski
Laëtitia Moussard
Nicole Antibe

New Zealand 
Tania Brunton
Belinda Colling
Megan Compain
Rebecca Cotton
Kirstin Daly
Gina Farmer
Sally Farmer
Dianne L'Ami
Donna Loffhagen
Julie Ofsoski
Leone Patterson
Leanne Walker

Poland 
Dorota Bukowska
Joanna Cupryś
Patrycja Czepiec
Katarzyna Dydek
Margo Dydek
Edyta Koryzna
Ilona Mądra
Beata Predehl
Krystyna Szymańska-Lara
Elżbieta Trześniewska
Anna Wielebnowska
Sylwia Wlaźlak

Russia 
 Svetlana Abrosimova
 Anna Arkhipova
 Elen Shakirova
 Yelena Khudashova
 Yevgeniya Nikonova
 Irina Rutkovskaya
 Irina Sumnikova
 Maria Stepanova
 Natalya Zasulskaya
 Yelena Pshikova
 Olga Arteshina

Senegal 
 Mame Maty Mbengue
 Bineta Diouf
 Yacine Khady Ngom
 Coumba Cissé
 Marieme Lo
 Awa Guèye
 Ndialou Paye
 Mbarika Fall
 Khady Diop
 Adama Diakhaté
 Fatime N'Diaye
 Astou N'Diaye

Slovakia 
 Slávka Frniaková
 Martina Godályová
 Renáta Hiráková
 Dagmar Huťková 
 Marcela Kalistová
 Anna Kotočová
 Alena Kováčová
 Lívia Libičová 
 Jana Lichnerová
 Martina Luptáková
 Katarína Poláková
 Zuzana Žirková

South Korea 

Korean names listed by family name first
 Lee Mi-Sun
 Chun Joo-Weon
 Kim Ji-Yoon
 Lee Eun-ju
 Jang Sun-Hyoung
 Wang Su-Jin
 Yang Jung-Ok
 Park Jung-Eun
 Kang Ji-Sook
 Lee Jong-Ae
 Jung Sun-Min
 Chung Eun-Soon

United States 

 Ruthie Bolton
 Teresa Edwards
 Yolanda Griffith
 Chamique Holdsclaw (retained on the roster, but did not play due to injury)
 Lisa Leslie
 Nikki McCray
 DeLisha Milton
 Katie Smith
 Dawn Staley
 Sheryl Swoopes
 Natalie Williams
 Kara Wolters
Head Coach: Nell Fortner

References

 
2000